North Yangon District is a district of the Yangon Region in Myanmar.

Townships
 East Hlaingthaya 
 Hlegu
 Hmawbi
 Htantabin
 Insein
 Mingaladon
 Shwepyitha
 Taikkyi
 West Hlaingthaya

Hlaingthaya was split into East and West in 2020.

References 

 

Districts of Myanmar